Melvin L. Morse is an American medical doctor who specializes in pediatrics. He has authored several books and articles on paranormal science and near-death experiences in children. Morse was arrested in 2012 and later convicted of child endangerment.

Morse's medical license was suspended in 2012. His license was later reinstated following a hearing in June 2022.

Early life and education
Morse graduated from Johns Hopkins University in Baltimore, Maryland in 1975 with a Bachelor of Arts degree in Natural Science. Morse earned a medical degree from George Washington University in Washington, D.C. in 1980. He interned in Pediatrics at the University of California at San Francisco, and then completed a residency in Pediatrics at Seattle Children's Hospital. He subsequently completed a two-year fellowship in Hematology/Oncology and a one-year fellowship in Behavioral Pediatrics.

Career
Morse practiced pediatrics in Renton, Washington during the 1980s, and also served as an Associate Professor of Pediatrics at the University of Washington in Seattle. In the mid 1980s, Morse began to research near death experiences. In November 1986, he published a study on the subject in the American Journal of Diseases of Children. The study interviewed 11 patients, who had all by definition had a near death experience, such as a cardiac arrest. These experiences were documented during interviews with the children, and then compared to 29 children that had been admitted to intensive care, but not had a near death experience. All of the near death children had memories from being unconscious, such as seeing a tunnel or light, and actively deciding to return to the body. In comparison, the 29 children in intensive care had no memory from the time they were unconscious.

Morse suggested to the Los Angeles Times during an interview that he and his colleagues at University of Washington School of Medicine had to abandon their initial theory - that near death experiences were simply a reaction to drugs during life saving attempts. Initially the aim of the research had been to narrow down which drugs likely caused near death experiences. The findings led Morse to spend the next decade of his life studying near death experiences. In 1991, Morse released Closer to the Light, which included some of the initial theories and further findings from investigating NDE's in children. In March 1995, Morse's studies featured in an article ran by the Los Angeles Times analyzing near death experiences. The book documented the near death experiences of 26 children and became a New York Times bestseller. He was interviewed on Oprah Winfrey about the book in 1992 and on Larry King in 2010. The PBS show Upon Reflection produced a half-hour episode devoted to Morse. He was the subject of an article in the Rolling Stone magazine in 2004 entitled "In search of the Dead Zone" and appeared in an episode of Unsolved Mysteries. In 2000, Morse and Paul Perry released a book studying the scientific frontiers in the study of cognitive psychology. The book "Where God Lives" presents the theory of plausibility in various subject areas, such as religion and the paranormal, including that religion is often associated with the right frontal lobe. This continued from research Morse did in the 1990s. A review in the peer reviewed Journal of Near-Death Studies stated "Morse wrote the book for mainstream audiences interested in a New Paradigm... it will hold their interest and fascinate them." John Tomlinson for the American Institute of Health and Science stated he believed the authors "lead us right to the edge of faith-based science."

He retired from the full-time practice of Pediatrics in 2006 and worked at a pediatrician office in Milton, Delaware. In 2012, he and his second wife were arrested on child endangerment charges based on allegations made by his eleven year old step-daughter. Morse was convicted of reckless endangerment and was sentenced to serve three years in prison. His license was also suspended in Delaware following his arrest. The step-daughter who made the allegations against Morse & his wife, was later proved to have lied on the witness stand in a previous case, which resulted in her sister spending a year in juvenile prison.

Following his release, Morse co-founded The Recidivism Prevention Group, a company dedicated to assisting addicts and former inmates in developing spiritual understandings to re-enter society as productive members. The group uses meditation techniques to accomplish these goals. Morse now resides in Washington, DC.

On September 13, 2022, Delaware's Medical Licensure and Discipline Board announced that the temporary suspension of Morse's medical license had been lifted. This was following a hearing by the board that took place on June 16, 2022.

Personal life
Morse has been married twice and has six children, five of whom are adopted.

Bibliography

Books

Journal articles

References

1953 births
Living people
American pediatricians
Near-death experience researchers
University of Washington faculty
People from Georgetown, Delaware
Johns Hopkins University alumni
George Washington University School of Medicine & Health Sciences alumni
American male criminals
Child abuse incidents and cases